Alexei Anatolyevich Savin (15 May 1986 — 18 June 2007) was a Belarusian professional forward ice hockey player.

A naturalised Belarusian, Savin played for Yunost Minsk and was one of the most promising young player of the country. He played in the 2005 and 2006 World Championships, as well as in the World Junior Ice Hockey Championships in 2005 and 2006.

Savin was killed in a road accident on 18 June 2007 in Chelyabinsk, Russia when his bicycle was ran down by a car, at age 21.

References

Road incident deaths in Russia
1986 births
2007 deaths
Belarusian ice hockey forwards